Cheremisino is a rural locality (a selo) in Zelenoborsky Selsoviet of Mikhaylovsky District, Amur Oblast, Russia. The population was 50 as of 2018. There are 2 streets.

Geography 
Cheremisino is located on the left bank of the Zavitaya River, 14 km north of Poyarkovo (the district's administrative centre) by road. Krasny Vostok is the nearest rural locality.

References 

Rural localities in Mikhaylovsky District, Amur Oblast